South Park Historic District is a national historic district located at Morgantown, Monongalia County, West Virginia. The district includes 501 contributing buildings and 5 contributing structures in a primarily residential area south of downtown Morgantown.  The district is characterized by tightly packed dwellings on a hillside and represent a variety of post-Victorian architectural styles popular between 1900 and 1940. Notable buildings include the First Church of Christ, Scientist, Morgantown High School, Crestholm Pharmacy, and Bobbette's Confectionary.

It was listed on the National Register of Historic Places in 1990.

References

Houses on the National Register of Historic Places in West Virginia
Historic districts on the National Register of Historic Places in West Virginia
Victorian architecture in West Virginia
Historic districts in Monongalia County, West Virginia
Houses in Morgantown, West Virginia
National Register of Historic Places in Monongalia County, West Virginia